Savannah Jane Buffett (born June 1, 1979 in Aspen, Colorado) is an American radio personality.  Buffett hosts the Savannah Daydreamin radio hour on the Sirius and XM satellite and online station Radio Margaritaville. Buffett began her professional career with the publication of The Jolly Mon (published in 1988) with her father, tropical folk artist Jimmy Buffett.  The pair collaborated again in writing Trouble Dolls (published in 1991).

Buffett was musical supervisor for the motion picture Hoot.  She has also done photography work which was used in Jimmy Buffett album jackets.  She is credited as appearing on mini congas in the Jimmy Buffett album "Floridays" and in the music video of Jimmy Buffett's cover of "Jamaica Farewell." She is also served as a backup vocalist from Maroon 5's Overexposed.

Buffett is currently the host of the travel show ExPats featured on YouTube's Reserve Channel. According to modern definition, EX-PATS are people temporarily or permanently residing in a country and culture other than that of their upbringing. Buffett travels through foreign lands to discover the extraordinary stories of those who cut the home-cord, leaving behind a seemingly successful and ordinary existence, in search of a place to live their dream life.

References 

American radio personalities
1979 births
Living people
American children's writers
Jimmy Buffett